Marc Ostrick (born 1973) is an American born filmmaker and content creator, specializing in television, documentaries and emerging media.  He attended the New World School of the Arts in Miami, Florida for High-School before attending the New York University Tisch School of the Arts for his Undergraduate in Film & Television Production and English Literature. In 2009 Marc Ostrick launched eGuiders, one of the first websites to curate and recommend the best videos across the internet from industry experts.

Career 
24: Conspiracy was the first narrative series made specifically for mobile devices in 2005. Dubbed "mobisodes" by Lucy Hood at News Corp. 24: Conspiracy was a digital spin off to the television series 24 and was nominated for an Emmy Award in the Broadband Entertainment category.  Ostrick was embedded in a television production to create and oversee a Transmedia Storytelling experience fully for the HBO series, John From Cincinnati (2006 - 2007), created by David Milch, and Kem Nunn.

Marc Ostrick's other credits include:
 Discovery Channel's Shark Week - Producer on the following programs: Deadliest Sharks (2016), Shark Vortex (2017), and Lair of the Sawfish (also Directed by). (2017)
 Fabien Cousteau's Mission 31 - Producer of the original content created on the expedition. (2014)
 MacGillivray Freeman Films - Launched and oversaw original content created for the One World One Ocean multi-platform campaigning. (2011 - 2013)
 Open Hearted - (2002) (director / producer)
 Without A Net: Creating NYPD Blue - Feature Documentary (2000) (director, writer, camera, editor)

References

External links 

1973 births
Living people
American environmentalists
American filmmakers
Tisch School of the Arts alumni